Mike Pateniotis (born 5 February 1984) is a Greek sailor. He competed at the 2012 Summer Olympics in the 49er class, finishing in 20th place.

At the 2016 Summer Olympics, he competed in the Nacra 17 Mixed event. His partner was Sofia Bekatorou. They finished in 18th place.

References

1984 births
Living people
Greek male sailors (sport)
Olympic sailors of Greece
Sailors at the 2012 Summer Olympics – 49er
Sailors at the 2016 Summer Olympics – Nacra 17